Idowu Philips (born 16 October 1942), popularly known as Iya Rainbow, is a Nigerian veteran actress.

Early life and career
Idowu Philips was born on 16 October 1942 at Ijebu Ode, a city in Ogun State, southwestern Nigeria.
She attended African Methodist School and Anglican Modern School for her primary and secondary education. Her stage name "Iya Rainbow" stems from "Osumare" (meaning "rainbow" in British English), the name of the theatre group of Sir Hubert Ogunde, who died in 1990.
Idowu Philips worked as a healthcare assistant in general hospitals in Nigeria for several years and occasionally acted in theatre. Idowu ventured into full-time acting after the death of her husband - Augustine Ayanfemi Phillips (who worked closely with the late patriarch of Nigerian Film Industry Sir Herbert Ogunde.
She has featured in several Nigerian films, including Apaadi, Eru, and Aje ni iya mi among others). Idowu has five children.

Endorsement

Idowu Philips is a brand ambassador for Airtel,a telecommunication company. Idowu Philip is also an ambassador for Yotomi Golden Estate, a low cost housing estate project,  initiated by the late movie mogul Alade Aromire.

Filmography

 1990    Yemi my Love
 1997- Back to Africa
 2000- Lagidigba
 2002- Jesu Mushin
 2002- Irepodun
 2002- Eyin Ogongo
 2003- N150 Million
 2003- Ìfé òtító 
 2003- Fila Daddy
 2003- Arewa okunrin
 2003- Omo oku òrun
 2003- Okun ife
 2004- Okun ife 2
 2004- Okan soso
 2004- Okan soso 2
 2004- Ògìdán 
 2004- Ògìdán 2
 2006- Abeni
 2006- Odun baku
 2006- Mewa n sele
 2006- Èebúdolá tèmi
 2006- Agbefo
 2006- Agbefo 2
 2007- Orita Ipinya 
 2007- Olugbare
 2007- Olóri
 2007- Maku
 2007- Kootu olohun
 2007- Kilebi olorun
 2008- Taiwo Taiwo 
 2008- Taiwo Taiwo 2
 2008- Itakun ola
 2008- Ìkúnlè kèsán
 2008- Ikilo agba
 2008- Igba ewa
 2008- Aje metta 
 2008- Aje metta 2
 2009- Ìpèsè 
 2009- Ìdàmu eléwòn
 2009- Elewon
 2009- Akoto olokada 
 2009- Akoto olokada 2
 2018- Oga Bolaji
 2019-  Sugar Rush
 2021- Becoming Abi

References

Living people
1942 births
Nigerian film actresses
Nigerian nurses
Yoruba actresses
Yoruba women nurses
People from Ijebu Ode
20th-century Nigerian actresses
21st-century Nigerian actresses
Actresses in Yoruba cinema
Actresses from Ogun State
Nigerian Christians
Ogunde family
Nigerian healthcare managers